Valtimo is a former municipality of Finland. It was merged with the town of Nurmes on 1 January 2020.

It was located in the North Karelia region. Neighbouring municipalities were Nurmes, Rautavaara and Sotkamo.

The municipality was unilingually Finnish.

Places in Valtimo 
 Pumppuamo

People
 Aki Karvonen (born 1957)
 Jarmo Kärnä (born 1958)

References

External links

Municipality of Valtimo – Official website 

Nurmes
Populated places established in 1910
Populated places disestablished in 2020
Former municipalities of Finland